Virgin Land is an album by  Brazilian jazz drummer and percussionist Airto Moreira (who was credited simply as "Airto") featuring performances recorded in 1974 and released on the Salvation label.

Reception
The Allmusic review states "An all-star cast accompanies Brazilian percussion master Airto Moreira on this percolating collection of jazz fusion pieces".

Track listing
All compositions by Airto Moreira except as indicated
 "Stanley's Tune" (Stanley Clarke) - 4:34 
 "Musikana" (Gabriel DeLorme) - 7:08 
 "Virgin Land" - 8:19 
 "Peasant Dance" (Milcho Leviev) - 3:33 
 "Lydian Riff" (Leviev) - 7:22 
 "Hot Sand" - 5:35 
 "I Don't Have To Do What I Don't Want To Do" (DeLorme, Moreira) - 3:17 
Recorded in Los Angeles, California on February 4, 1974 and in New York City on February 19, 1974

Personnel
Airto - drums, percussion, vocals
George Duke - keyboards, piano, synthesizer
Milcho Leviev - keyboards
Kenny Ascher - piano, mellotron
David Amaro, Gabriel DeLorme - electric guitar
Alex Blake, Stanley Clarke - electric bass
Flora Purim - vocals
Eddie Daniels - clarinet
George Marge - oboe, piccolo
Jane Taylor - bassoon

References

CTI Records albums
Airto Moreira albums
1974 albums